The Lieutenant Governor of Connecticut serves as the President of the Connecticut Senate, but only casts a vote if required to break a tie. In his or her absence, the President Pro Tempore of the Connecticut Senate presides. The President pro tempore is elected by the majority party caucus followed by confirmation of the entire Senate through a Senate Resolution. The President pro tempore is the chief leadership position in the Senate. The Senate majority and minority leaders are elected by their respective party caucuses. 

The current President pro tempore of the Connecticut Senate is Martin M. Looney, a Democrat who has served since 2015.

List of presidents pro tempore of the Connecticut Senate 

 1 Succeeded to the office of Lieutenant Governor. Took oath of office January 17, 1966.
 2 Became President Pro Tempore when Fred Doocy became Lieutenant Governor.
 3 Succeeded to the office of Lieutenant Governor. Took oath of office June 7, 1973.
 4 Became President Pro Tempore when Peter L. Cashman became Lieutenant Governor.
 5 Succeeded to the office of Lieutenant Governor. Took oath of office December 31, 1980.
 6 Succeeded to the office of Lieutenant Governor. Took oath of office July 1, 2004.
 7 Became President Pro Tempore when Kevin B. Sullivan became Lieutenant Governor.

Notes

External links
 Presidents pro tempore of the Connecticut Senate

 
Lists of Connecticut politicians